Henri (Enrique) Ciriani (born 1936) is a Peruvian architect and teacher. Ciriani was born and worked in Lima, Peru before moving to Paris in 1964. He has worked on modernist experimental living projects in the 1960s and 1970s, such as the San Felipe housing complex in Lima, Peru, and in 1980 on the Noisy II housing plan for Marne-la-Vallée. He also designed the St. Antoine Hospital kitchen building in Paris in 1985, the Museum of the Great War in Peronne in 1992, and the Archaeological Museum in Arles in 1993.

References

20th-century French architects
21st-century French architects
Peruvian architects
Commandeurs of the Ordre des Arts et des Lettres
1936 births
Living people
People from Lima